The Islington Green War Memorial is a war memorial located at Islington Green in the London Borough of Islington.

A "temporary" memorial was erected at the site in 1918 by Charles Higham.  The original memorial consisted of a painted concrete obelisk, with bronze plaques and wreath, and concrete flower boxes to either side.  After the council proposed landscaping work at Islington Green, it became clear in 2004 that the old memorial needed to be replaced, and it was demolished in 2006.

A new memorial was completed in 2007, designed by artist . His proposal for a twisted stone ring, reminiscent of a wreath, was accepted by a memorial commission, which included representatives from the local Royal British Legion, the Canonbury Society, and representatives from the council.

The stone for the new memorial was sourced from Fujian province in eastern China, and the  ring was carved in China before being shipped to England.  An inscription on a nearby slab repeats the words from the original memorial, "In Memory of the Fallen"; separate slabs bear the words "Land", "Sea", "Air" and "Home".  The project cost £490,000, of which the stone for the memorial, and the apron and walls, cost approximately £100,000. 
 
Remedial work was required in 2013 after the new memorial started to sink because its foundations were inadequate.

See also
 2007 in art

In popular culture 

 The memorial features in the children's book Gaspard's Foxtrot by local author Zeb Soanes, illustrated by James Mayhew and is referenced in the composer Jonathan Dove's orchestral adaptation of the story.

References

 Islington Green War Memorial Repaired by Greg Warren (May 19, 2014), Islington Labour
 Islington's War Shrine 1918, British Pathé
 Inquiry over sinking war memorial that will force veterans to lay wreaths against a fence, Islington Tribune, 7 November 2013
 Islington (lost), Imperial War Museum

2007 establishments in England
2007 sculptures
Military memorials in London
Outdoor sculptures in London
Tourist attractions in the London Borough of Islington
World War I memorials in England
World War II memorials in England